Ani (asomtavruli , nuskhuri , mkhedruli ა) is the 1st letter of the three Georgian scripts.

In the system of Georgian numerals it has a value of 1.

Letter

Stroke order

Evolution

Evolution in Asomtavruli

Evolution in all scripts

Computer encodings

Braille

Related letters and other similar characters
Latin letter A
Cyrillic letter A
Alpha, Greek letter

References

Bibliography

Mchedlidze, T. I, The restored Georgian alphabet, Fulda, Germany, 2013
Mchedlidze, T. II, The Georgian script; Dictionary and guide, Fulda, Germany, 2013
Machavariani, E. Georgian manuscripts, Tbilisi, 2011
The Unicode Standard, Version 6.3, (1) Georgian, 1991-2013
The Unicode Standard, Version 6.3, (2) Georgian Supplement, 1991-2013

Georgian letters